is the 20th single by Japanese entertainer Miho Nakayama. Written by Yoshihiko Andō and Hitoshi Haba, the single was released on October 22, 1990, by King Records.

Background and release
"Aishiterutte Iwanai!" was used as the theme song of the Fuji TV drama series , which also starred Nakayama. The B-side is "Without You", a Christmas song written by Nakayama (under her pseudonym "Mizuho Kitayama") for a Citizen Watch commercial she starred in.

"Aishiterutte Iwanai!" became Nakayama's third straight No. 3 on Oricon's weekly singles chart. It sold over 361,000 copies and was certified Gold by the RIAJ.

Nakayama performed the song on the 41st Kōhaku Uta Gassen in 1990.

Track listing

Charts
Weekly charts

Year-end charts

Certification

References

External links

1990 singles
1990 songs
Japanese-language songs
Japanese television drama theme songs
Miho Nakayama songs
King Records (Japan) singles